Ourinhos is a municipality in the state of São Paulo in Brazil.

The municipality of Ourinhos was created in 1919 by separating it from Salto Grande. One version of its etymology is that the name "Ourinhos" (small gold pebbles) is a reference to the old city of Ourinho, on the other side of the Paranapanema river, which today is Jacarezinho, in Paraná state. It is also one of the main cities in São Paulo state's SW region, having trade and services as its main economic activities. In agriculture, sugar cane, soy, and corn (maize) are the main crops.

The city also has an important cultural tradition that goes from arts and crafts to theater, music and sports. The city also stands out in its promotion of cultural and economic events and fairs often organized by the city hall and with the help of local companies. The major one is the Ourinhos Agricultural and Industrial Fair (FAPI), which is held annually in June and is considered one of the largest events of this nature  in Brazil.

The city is served by Jornalista Benedito Pimentel State Airport.

References